Saud bin Abdulaziz bin Nasser Al Saud (born 1977) is a member of the Saudi royal family and a convicted murderer. He is a grandson of King Saud.

Murder and trial
In February 2010, he was found guilty at the Old Bailey of murdering his servant Bandar Abdulaziz in their suite at the Landmark Hotel in London. During the trial, it was alleged that the prince had received a "sexual massage" before the murder, and that he and Abdulaziz had been in a homosexual relationship.  It was also alleged that the murder was a culmination of an extremely abusive "Master-Slave" relationship. The prince maintained that he and his victim were "friends and equals" ,and denied an alleged homosexual relationship between the two. 

However, prosecutor Jonathan Laidlaw stated that the evidence found - including photographs stored on a mobile phone and traces of semen on the victim's underwear - "establishes quite conclusively that (Al Saud) was either gay or had homosexual inclinations. Prosecutor Jonathan Laidlaw also said the prince had abused his aide in the past, showing jurors a video shot in the Landmark's elevator which appears to show the shaven-headed prince, dressed in white, throwing his 32-year-old servant around and battering him. 

On October 20, 2010, Saud Abdulaziz bin Nasser al Saud was sentenced to life imprisonment and was ordered to serve a minimum of 20 years for strangling and beating Bandar Abdulaziz to death. In March, 2013 he was allowed to return to Saudi Arabia to serve the remainder of his term in a Saudi prison. According to the agreement between the U.K. and Saudi Arabia, he must serve at least 20 years before he can be released.

Family

Saud's maternal grandfather was Saud of Saudi Arabia, who was the brother of King Abdullah who was the king at the time when Saud was convicted and sentenced by a court in the UK. Both of Saud's parents belong to the Saudi royal family. They are first cousins to each other, being the children of two half-brothers, both of whom were the sons of King Abdulaziz, the founder of the modern Saudi state. Saud's father is Abdulaziz bin Nasser, the son of Nasser bin Abdulaziz, himself the son of King Abdulaziz. Saud's mother, Fayza, is the daughter of Saud of Saudi Arabia, himself a son of King Abdulaziz.

References

Living people
1977 births
2010 in London
2010 murders in the United Kingdom
Saudi Arabian people convicted of murder
Saudi Arabian LGBT people
Prisoners and detainees of England and Wales
Prisoners and detainees of Saudi Arabia
Saud